The fifth Rugby League World Cup was held in Great Britain in 1970. Britain, fresh from defeating Australia in the Ashes during their Australasian tour earlier in the year (the last time as of 2017 that they would win The Ashes), were hot favourites, and won all three of their group stage games, including defeating Australia 11–4. All the other nations lost two games each, and Australia qualified for the final largely on the back of an impressive tally of points against New Zealand.

The final was held at Headingley, Leeds. Although Great Britain dominated the possession, the Kangaroos were able to exploit their chances, and ran out unexpected winners in a scrappy game that became known as the "Battle of Leeds".

Australian centre Bob Fulton was named the official player of the tournament.

After winning the tournament, the Australian team put the World Cup trophy on display in the Midland Hotel in Bradford. From there it was stolen and remained unseen for the next 20 years.

Squads

Venues 
Headingley in Leeds hosted a group game between Great Britain and Australia and also hosted the World Cup Final.

Results 

Australia beat the Kiwis easily at Wigan in the opening fixture with Eric Simms repeating his form of the 1968 tourney by landing a record ten goals.

Britain came from 0–4 behind to defeat Australia 11–4 at Headingley with Syd Hynes scoring the game's only try.

The try of the tournament was scored by the sensational French winger Serge Marsolan against New Zealand in a mud-bath at Hull. Marsolan ran from behind his own line for a try fit to win any match but the lackadaisical French lost 15–16.

The French put up a great fight against Britain in vile conditions, only to lose 0–6 at Castleford to three penalties from Ray Dutton.

Britain eliminated New Zealand from the tournament, cruising to victory with five tries to three.

This incredibly exciting game has been described as the tournament's piece de resistance. Aussie centre Bobby Fulton scored a try within seconds of the kick-off – probably the quickest ever in international matches. However, with ten minutes to go and the scores level at 15–15, the French stole the game when stand-off half Jean Capdouze dropped a monster goal. The Kangaroos' loss to France meant it was Australia's superior points differential (on the back of their pointsfest in the opening game against New Zealand) alone that got them into the final with the undefeated Great Britain team.

Table

Final 

Having retained the Ashes, Great Britain were favourites to win the final, which would become known as the 'Battle of Headingley' due to its brutality. However it went completely against expectations as Britain failed to play any decent football despite overwhelming possession. The Kangaroos led 5–4 at half-time with a try to Australian three-quarter, Father John Cootes. They went on to utilise their meagre chances to the full, running out 12–7 victors. The game itself was an extended punch-up. The only surprise was that it took 79 minutes before anyone was sent off. Two sacrificial lambs, Billy Smith of Australia and Syd Hynes of Britain, were sent off the field in the last minute for what had been going unpunished throughout the game.

Try scorers 
5

  John Cootes

4

  Serge Marsolan

2

  Bob Fulton
  John Atkinson
  Syd Hynes
  Garry Smith

1

  Ray Branighan
  Ron Coote
  Bob McCarthy
  Eric Simms
  Billy Smith
  Ron Turner
  Lionel Williamson
  Élie Bonal
  Jean Capdouze
  Chris Hesketh
  Doug Laughton
  Cliff Watson
  Mocky Brereton
  Roy Christian
  Graeme Cooksley
  Tony Kriletich

References

External links 
 1970 World Cup at rlhalloffame.org.uk
 1970 World Cup at rlwc2008.com
 1970 World Cup at rugbyleagueproject.com
 1970 World Cup final at eraofthebiff.com
 1970 World Cup data at hunterlink.net.au
 1970 World Cup at 188-rugby-league.co.uk